The Mohawk Valley region is in the U.S. state of New York.

Mohawk Valley may also refer to:

The valley of the Mohawk River, a major river in the U.S. state of New York
Mohawk Valley (Arizona)
Mohawk Valley, California, former name of Mohawk, California
Mohawk River (Oregon)